is a national park in Mie Prefecture, Japan. It is characterized by its ria coast and islands scattered around a number of bays. The interior is hilly with Mount Asama-ga-take ( the highest peak.

Natural areas
 Ago Bay
 Kami-shima
 Kashiko-jima
 Kozukumi-jima
 Gokasho Bay
 Matoya Bay
 Mount Asama-ga-take 
 Tōshi-jima

Cultural sites
 Ise Jingū
 Meoto Iwa
 Kongōshō-ji

Related municipalities
 Ise
 Toba
 Shima
 Minami-Ise

See also
 List of national parks of Japan

References

External links

  Ise-Shima National Park
  Ise-Shima National Park
  Map of Ise-Shima National Park (PDF)

1946 establishments in Japan
National parks of Japan
Parks and gardens in Mie Prefecture
Protected areas established in 1946